The Tech Report is a web site which used to be dedicated to covering personal computing technology and culture. The Tech Report specialized in hardware and produced a quarterly system build guides at various price points, and occasional price vs. performance scatter plots. Tech Report also has an online community and used to have an active podcast. Some of the site's investigative articles regarding hardware benchmarking have been cited by other technology news sites like Anandtech and PC World.
The site went through ownership change and major redesign in middle of 2019 after which the site's focus and content went through significant changes, no longer specializing in hardware or producing any system guides, podcasts and no longer being focused on computer technology.

History 
Tech Report was founded by Scott 'Damage' Wasson, a Harvard Divinity School graduate, and Andy 'Dr. Evil' Brown. Both started by writing at Ars Technica in 1998. The two later decided to launch their own website.  The site eventually grew into a business enterprise with multiple full-time staff members.

Tech Report was originally located at tech-report.com in 1999. The site was moved to techreport.com in 2003.

On August 20, 2007 a beta for a new site design was posted in the forums for review by the user community. It was later moved to live.

Launching on January 1, 2011, the new site design, TR 3.0 rolled out. It offered a completely new layout and two user switchable colors, blue and white, along with a reduced mobile device format.

On December 2, 2015 Scott Wasson, the founder and Editor-In-Chief stepped down as he accepted a role in AMD's graphics division. Wasson subsequently sold the company in March 2018 to Adam Eiberger, the Tech Report's business manager.

On December 21, 2018 Jeff Kampman stepped down as Editor-In-Chief. The site was then sold to investors John Rampton and John Rall, and Renee Johnson took over as Editor-in-Chief.

On July 7, 2019, coinciding with the release of AMD's Ryzen 3 CPUs and Navi GPUs, a site redesign was launched moving from the Tech Report's former custom CMS and functionality to a Wordpress template. On July 9, Johnson posted an introduction to the design. The new redesign was met with criticism from the users. In August of same year, TechReport staff has removed all mention of  former Editor-in-Chief Jeff Kampman at his own request, and replaced his name with Renee Johnson on all articles Kampman contributed. His "farewell" message that he posted on December 21 of 2018 was also deleted from the site. The TechReport "About" page was also edited and all information about original founders was removed. The focus of the site has also changed from focus on hardware news, reviews and system guides to product promotion articles presented as reviews without using actual products or providing benchmark data for them  and to so-called listicles which may or may not be related to computing technology.

AMD TLB bug investigation 
TechReport was one of the first sites in 2007 to document and benchmark the flaw in the translation lookaside buffer (TLB) of AMD Phenom CPUs. Despite claims by AMD that the initial BIOS fix would only result in 10% performance decrease, benchmarks by TechReport have revealed that the performance impact by the initial BIOS fix was much more severe, up to nearly 20% on average, with some applications such as Firefox experiencing performance decrease of 57% in tests. They were also the first one to notify about AMD stopping the shipment of processors due to this bug.

Video game and GPU performance benchmarking research 

On September 8, 2011 Scott Wasson posted an article titled "Inside the second: A new look at game benchmarking". This showed gamers that frames per second(FPS) are not the only thing that matters in "smooth" gameplay, but frame latency has a big part. This innovative benchmarking method was later mentioned and acknowledged by other publications such as Anandtech, which described this method as "a revolution in the 3D game benchmarking scene" and Overclockers.

SSD Endurance Experiment 

In 2013, TechReport has started an experiment using several SSD drives to determine how many writes they can endure. This test has lasted for more than 18 months before all drives used in this test have failed, enduring much larger amount of written data than rated by manufacturers themselves, and even prompting one of the manufacturers, Samsung, to release a humorous music video dedicated to this test.

Site Structure

Main Page 
A large portion of the main page was dedicated to "News" and "Blog" entries. Among the news entries were "Shortbread" posts which offered a summary breakdown of reviews and news offered by other sites. Featured articles were often reviews of newly released PC hardware which had been tested by the site's editors and judged on a number of metrics including performance and value compared to other available hardware. After the takeover of the site by new owners and major changes the "Shortbread" feature ended and most "reviews" consist of products being presented for advertising purposes through referral links without actual review of those products by the site editors.

Podcast 

Adapting to the general trend of more content for digest, The Tech Report launched their own podcast on February 9, 2008 hosted by Jordan Drake. While the schedule has varied it provides a casual but quite in-depth look back at the topics that made news from a panel of the site staff. Subsequent to 2015 episodes were released irregularly, frequently discussing the release of a new microarchitecture with David Kanter of Real World Technologies. Last podcast was made in January 2018 and no more podcasts were made since then.

Community and Forum 
Tech Report has a phpBB-styled forum that is unrestricted in read-only form and open to the public for contribution via simple registration.  The forum is primarily structured around computer technology and related topics, but debates also range from politics and religion in the "opt-in only" R&P forum to general random chatter in the Back Porch.  Contributors to the website also have access to a restricted forum called the Smoky Back Room. Registered users may respond to news topics and other entries posted on the front page in an isolated threaded comments section that automatically attaches to each new entry.  Although access to the main page comments is linked into the user database, the discussions are logged separately from the forum area of the site and are not counted toward the user forum statistics.

References

External links 
 

American technology news websites
Computing websites
Internet properties established in 1999
1999 establishments in the United States